David Winn (born July 31, 1966) is an American animator and writer who works in several animation projects.

Career
David Winn has worked as an animator in the series Happy Tree Friends, The Fairly OddParents, LeapFrog, Disney's House of Mouse and many other animated shows and video games.

He also directed the animated short film Fleeced which was shown at numerous animation film festivals including the Annecy International Animation Festival.

Winn also replaced Rhode Montijo as the voices of Lumpy the Moose and Splendid the Flying Squirrel in Happy Tree Friends in 2004.

External links
 
 

American animators
American animated film directors
Flash artists
Living people
American male writers
1966 births